The Two-woman event of the FIBT World Championships 2015 was held on 26–28 February 2015.

Results
The first two runs were started on 26 February at 14:45 and the last two runs on 28 February at 13:30.

References

Two-woman